The Dream Team is a 1989 American comedy thriller film directed by Howard Zieff and produced by Christopher W. Knight for Imagine Entertainment and Universal Pictures. It stars Michael Keaton, Christopher Lloyd, Peter Boyle and Stephen Furst as mental-hospital inpatients who are left unsupervised in New York City during a field trip gone awry. Jon Connolly and David Loucka wrote the screenplay.

Plot
Dr. Jeff Weitzman is a psychologist working in a sanitarium in New Jersey. His primary patients are Billy, Henry, Jack and Albert. Billy has the most mental capacity of the group and is their de facto leader, though he is a pathological liar with violent tendencies. Henry suffers from OCD and has deluded himself into thinking he is one of the doctors at the hospital, often walking around with a clipboard, lab coat and stethoscope. Jack is a former advertising executive who believes he is Jesus Christ. Finally, Albert is a man-child who can only communicate using baseball terminology, particularly from former ball player and commentator Phil Rizzuto.

Convinced that his patients need a change of scenery, Dr. Weitzman persuades the administration to allow him to take them to a baseball game at Yankee Stadium. Unfortunately, he accidentally encounters two corrupt cops just as they murder another officer. The doctor then gets knocked unconscious trying to get away and is put in the hospital. The group is now stranded in New York City, forced to cope with a place which is often more bizarre than their sanitarium.

After Dr. Weitzman's beating and coma, it is up to the patients to save their doctor from being murdered by the cops. They end up having to both use and overcome their delusions and disorders in order to save the only man who ever tried to help them, with both the police and the killers looking for them. Three revisit scenes from their pasts: Billy (former girlfriend Riley), Henry (his wife and daughter), and Jack (his former employer). As each patient does so individually, they each behave in a competent, rational manner, Henry genuinely missing his family, Billy wishing to pursue a more serious relationship, and Jack appealing to his boss that he and his friends are in trouble (but the boss reports Jack to the police).

Ultimately, the patients succeed in turning in the criminals. Their doctor makes a recovery and the patients again attempt a trip to the ballpark, this time with no supervision.

Cast
 Michael Keaton as Billy Caufield
 Christopher Lloyd as Henry Sikorsky
 Peter Boyle as Jack McDermott
 Stephen Furst as Albert Ianuzzi
 Dennis Boutsikaris as Dr. Jeff Weitzman
 Lorraine Bracco as Riley
 Milo O'Shea as Dr. Newald
 Philip Bosco as O'Malley
 James Remar as Gianelli
 Michael Lembeck as Ed, Riley's ex-boyfriend
 Jack Duffy as Bernie
 Larry Pine as Canning
 Ted Simonett as a yuppie
 John Stocker as Murray
 Lizbeth MacKay as Henry's wife
 Ron James as Dwight
 Wayne Tippit as Captain Lewitt
 Freda Foh Shen as a TV newscaster
 Dennis Parlato as TV newscaster
 Donna Hanover as a field reporter
 Jihmi Kennedy as the tow truck driver

Reception
The movie had a mixed reception, with Vincent Canby stating that "there's nothing dreadfully wrong with The Dream Team, Howard Zieff's new comedy, except that it's not funny too much of the time. On those occasions when it is funny, the humor less often prompts laughter than mute appreciation of the talents of the principal performers - Michael Keaton, Christopher Lloyd and Peter Boyle." Michael Wilmington noted that "[the film] is so clearly derived from the movie "One Flew Over the Cuckoo's Nest" that you might begin to wonder when Jack Nicholson will show up. [...which] may suggest that "Dream Team" is a weak, derivative, somehow disreputable movie, which is somewhat true. If you compare it to its obvious source, it has a coy, flip attitude toward illness, skating over the surface of tragedy, dementia and pain without breaking the ice. The union of four oddballs—rebel-writer, obsessive noodge, religious fanatic and couch potato—is almost too schematic, as if the writers were somehow trying to define '80s dissidence. But even though you can predict virtually everything that happens from the first five minutes on, the director and actors manage to hook you in." It currently holds a 50% rating on Rotten Tomatoes from 16 reviews.

Box office
The Dream Team debuted at No. 2 at the American box office, where it made $5.7 million at 1,316 theaters, averaging US$4,335 per screen. It opened only one number shy of a competing Paramount film, Major League. It went down from that position in subsequent weeks.

See also
Krazzy 4 - an unofficial Hindi language remake with the same story.

References

External links

 
 
 

1980s English-language films
1989 comedy-drama films
1989 comedy films
1989 crime drama films
1989 films
American comedy-drama films
Fictional quartets
Films about psychiatry
Films directed by Howard Zieff
Films set in New Jersey
Films set in New York City
Films shot in New York City
Imagine Entertainment films
Universal Pictures films
1980s American films